The 2017–18 season is Ittihad Riadi Tanger's 35th in existence and the club's 19th season in the top flight of Moroccan football, and Third consecutive season in the first division of Moroccan football after the promotion.

Ittihad Tanger were confirmed to be champions of the 2017–18 Botola season on 12 May 2018, finishing atop the first division of Moroccan football for the first time in club history.

Kit
Supplier: Bang Sports / Club Sponsor: front: Renault, APM Terminals, Moroccan Airports Authority, Tanger-Med ; back: Valencia ; short: RCI Finance Maroc / League Sponsor: front: Maroc Telecom.

Season review

May
On 15 May, the club announced the transfers of 17-year-old left-back Hatim El Ouahabi from Widad Juventud  for the next five seasons, for 200,000 MAD.

On 20 May, the club announced Ezzaki Badou would be the new IR Tanger coach.

June
On 2 June, the contracts of players Bakre El Helali, Abdelghani Mouaoui, Mohamed Amsif, Youssef Sekour, Jamal Ait Lamaalem, Zakaria Melhaoui, Soufian El Hassnaoui, Soufiane Gadoum, Ismaël Daoud, Yahya Boumediene, and Abdoulaye Diarra expired.

On 6 June,  Ittihad Tanger and both Ayoub El Khaliqi and Mehdi Baltham negotiated a two-year contract extension lasting until 2019.

July
On 15 July, Ittihad Tanger won their first pre-season match against Rajae Al Boughaz with a 4–0 .

On 18 July, the club loaned Younes Ed-dyb to US Musulmane d'Oujda.

On 19 July, Ittihad Tanger defeated Chabab Alam Tanger 8–0.

On 22 July, Ittihad Tanger were defeated by Moghreb Tétouan 1–0 at Stade Municipal d'Asilah.

On 26 July, the club announced Renault signed up as IR Tanger's new main partner; the French company will appear on the front of the team's shirt for the next three seasons, starting the season 2017–2018.

On 28 July, Ittihad Tanger won 4–0 against KAC Kénitra in a pre-season friendly.

August
On 3 August,  the club announced they have reached an agreement with Al-Qadisiyah for the transfer of Hervé Guy for 300,000 dollars.

On 4 August, Ittihad Tanger were defeated by DR Congo local football team 2–0 at Centre National De Foot Maamoura in Rabat.

On 6 August, the club completed the transfer of 28-year-old forward Mehdi Naghmi from AS FAR on a three-year contract,

On 7 August, Ittihad Tanger defeated Spanish Third División team Algeciras 4–2 in Tangier with goals from Ayoub El Khaliqi, Ismail Benlamalem, Yassine Amrioui and Ahmed Chentouf.

On 10 August, Ittihad Tanger defeated KAC Marrakech 1–0 in a pre-season friendly.

On 16 August, Ittihad Tanger lost 2–1 to Chabab Rif Al Hoceima in the last pre-season friendly match.

On 22 August, Ittihad Tanger drew US Kacemie 1–1, gave USK a slight advantage going into the second leg.

On 27 August, Ittihad Tanger won 1–0 against Union Sidi Kacem; Naghmi scored the only goal from penalty as IRT cruised into the last 16 of the Coupe du Trône.

September
On 4 September, Ittihad Tanger and Abdelhafid Lirki agreed to mutually terminate the defender's contract.

On 7 September, Ittihad Tanger announced they had reached an agreement with AS Athlétic d'Adjamé for the transfer of N'do Didier Pepe.

On 9 September, Ittihad Tanger defeated RSB Berkane 3–0 in their first Botola match of the season, following an own goal from Laarbi Naji, and Mehdi Naghmi scored two goals.

On 13 September, Ittihad Tanger  draw 0–0 against DH Jadidi.

On 18 September, IR Tanger drew 1–1 with Racing AC, with Chentouf scoring the equalizer in the 70th minute.

On 18 September, Ittihad Tanger announced they had reached an agreement with Raja Casablanca for the transfer of Mohamed Bouldini for 60,000 dollars. The player will sign a three-year contract.

On 19 September, the club announced they have reached an agreement with Olympique Khouribga for the transfer of Mame Saher Thioune.

On 21 September, Ittihad Tanger and RSB Berkane reached an agreement for the transfer of Enes Šipović. and the club loaned Abdelali Assri and Abdelghafour Jebroun to Widad Tanger, and Yasser Imrani to Fath Wislan.

May

On 12 May, Ittihad Tanger defeated Moghreb Tétouan 2–1 to win their 1st Botola title in club history.

Players

squad

 (vice-captain)

 (captain)

From youth squad

Out during the season

Transfers

In (summer)

 IRTfoot.ma 

 IRTfoot.ma 
 IRTfoot.ma
 IRTfoot.ma (600.000 MAD)
 ]</ref>

Out (summer)

 IRTfoot.ma
 IRTfoot.ma
 IRTfoot.ma
 IRTfoot.ma
 IRTfoot.ma
 IRTfoot.ma
 IRTfoot.ma
 IRTfoot.ma
 IRTfoot.ma
 IRTfoot.ma
 IRTfoot.ma

 IRTfoot.ma (300.000 $)
 IRTfoot.ma
 IRTfoot.ma
 IRTfoot.ma
 IRTfoot.ma (? 99.000 $)
 IRTfoot.ma
 IRTfoot.ma
 IRTfoot.ma

In (winter)

 IRTfoot.ma 
 IRTfoot.ma
 IRTfoot.ma
 IRTfoot.ma

Out (winter)

 IRTfoot.ma
 IRTfoot.ma
 IRTfoot.ma
 IRTfoot.ma
 IRTfoot.ma
 
 RajaClubAthletic.ma

Technical staff 

until 21 November 2017

Statistics

Squad appearances and goals
Last updated on 20 May 2018.

|-
! colspan=10 style=background:#dcdcdc; text-align:center|Goalkeepers

|-
! colspan=10 style=background:#dcdcdc; text-align:center|Defenders

|-
! colspan=10 style=background:#dcdcdc; text-align:center|Midfielders

|-
! colspan=10 style=background:#dcdcdc; text-align:center|Forwards

|-
! colspan=10 style=background:#dcdcdc; text-align:center| Players who have made an appearance or had a squad number this season but have left the club
|-

|-
|}

Goalscorers

Assists

Clean sheets
As of 20 May 2018.

Disciplinary record

Pre-season and friendlies

Competitions

Overview

Botola

League table

Results summary

Results by round

Matches

Results overview

Throne Cup

Round of 32

Round of 16

See also
2015–16 IR Tanger season
2016–17 IR Tanger season

References

External links

Ittihad Tanger
Moroccan football clubs 2017–18 season